Röhm affair may refer to:
Röhm scandal, political scandal in 1931 and 1932 resulting from the public disclosure of Ernst Röhm's homosexuality
Night of the Long Knives, murder of Röhm and dozens of other Nazis in 1934